Scipione Pasquali (died 1624) was a Roman Catholic prelate who served as Bishop of Casale Monferrato (1615–1624).

Biography
On 12 January 1615, Scipione Pasquali was appointed during the papacy of Pope Paul V as Bishop of Casale Monferrato.
On 1 February 1615, he was consecrated bishop by Giovanni Garzia Mellini, Cardinal-Priest of Santi Quattro Coronati with Ulpiano Volpi, Archbishop of Chieti, and Marco Cornaro (bishop), Bishop of Padua, serving as co-consecrators. 
He served as Bishop of Casale Monferrato until his death in 1624.

References

External links and additional sources
 (for Chronology of Bishops) 
 (for Chronology of Bishops)  

17th-century Italian Roman Catholic bishops
Bishops appointed by Pope Paul V
1624 deaths